The 1973 season was the Minnesota Vikings' 13th in the National Football League (NFL). With a 12–2 record, the Vikings regained the NFC Central title after having gone 7–7 the previous year. They started the season 9–0 and looked a threat to the previous year's Miami Dolphins' record of a perfect season before losing to the Atlanta Falcons and Cincinnati Bengals in their next three games. Their narrow 10–9 win over the Los Angeles Rams constituted the last time until 1997 that the last two unbeaten NFL teams played each other.

The Vikings defeated the Washington Redskins 27–20 in the NFC Divisional Playoff game at home and went on to upset the Dallas Cowboys 27–10 in Irving, Texas to win the NFC Championship, before losing 24–7 to the Dolphins in Super Bowl VIII at Rice Stadium in Houston.

Offseason

1973 Draft

 The Vikings traded QB Gary Cuozzo to the St. Louis Cardinals in exchange for St. Louis' second- and fourth-round selections (34th and 89th overall), and WR John Gilliam.
 The Vikings traded their second-round selection (40th overall), 1972 first-round selection (24th overall), QB Norm Snead, WR Bob Grim and RB Vince Clements to the New York Giants in exchange for QB Fran Tarkenton.
 The Vikings traded QB Bill Cappleman to the Philadelphia Eagles in exchange for Philadelphia's fourth-round selection (80th overall).
 The Vikings traded their fourth-round selection (89th overall), LB Mike McGill and DB Dale Hackbart to the St. Louis Rams in exchange for TE Bob Brown and CB Nate Wright.
 The Vikings traded their fourth-round selection (89th overall) to the Kansas City Chiefs in exchange for P Mike Eischeid.
 The Vikings traded TE Bob Brown to the New Orleans Saints in exchange for New Orleans' sixth-round selection (139th overall) and 1974 fourth-round selection (86th overall).
 The Vikings traded LB Bill Cody to the Philadelphia Eagles in exchange for Philadelphia's 10th-round selection (236th overall).
 Following college, Dave Winfield was drafted by four teams in three different sports. The San Diego Padres selected him as an outfielder with the fourth overall pick in the 1973 Major League Baseball draft. In basketball, both the Atlanta Hawks (NBA) and the Utah Stars (ABA) drafted him. Although he never played college football, the Minnesota Vikings selected Winfield in the 17th round of the NFL draft. He is currently one of three players ever to be drafted by three professional sports (the others being Dave Logan and Mickey McCarty).

Roster

Preseason

Regular season

Schedule

Notes
Intra-division opponents are in bold text.

Game summaries

Week 1: vs. Oakland Raiders

Week 2: at Chicago Bears

Week 3: vs. Green Bay Packers

Week 4: at Detroit Lions

Week 5: at San Francisco 49ers

Week 6: vs. Philadelphia Eagles

Week 7: vs. Los Angeles Rams

Week 8: vs. Cleveland Browns

Week 9: vs. Detroit Lions

Week 10: at Atlanta Falcons

Week 11: vs. Chicago Bears

The day of this game was declared "Karl Kassulke Day" in honor of former Viking safety Karl Kassulke, who was left paralyzed in a motorcycle accident just before the beginning of training camp. A wheelchair-bound Kassulke attended the game and shook hands with the players on the field at halftime.

Week 12: at Cincinnati Bengals

Week 13: at Green Bay Packers

Week 14: at New York Giants

Standings

Playoffs

Schedule

Game summaries

NFC Divisional Playoff: vs. Washington Redskins

Minnesota scored 17 points in the fourth quarter to overcome a 13–10 deficit, including two touchdowns in a span of 1:05.

Both offenses struggled in the first quarter. The Vikings were completely unable to move the ball, finishing the quarter without any first downs, while Washington kicker Curt Knight missed two field goal attempts. One miss was from 49 yards and the other from 17, spoiling an impressive drive that saw the Redskins drive from their own 14 to inside the Vikings 10-yard line.

Minnesota finally managed to get rolling in the second quarter, with a 50-yard completion from Tarkenton to running back Oscar Reed setting up Fred Cox's 19-yard field goal. But with 3:30 left in the half, Vikings defensive back Bobby Bryant fumbled a punt return that was recovered by Redskins running back Bob Brunet on the Minnesota 21-yard line. Billy Kilmer then completed a 17-yard pass to Charley Taylor before Larry Brown scored on a 3-yard touchdown run to give the Redskins a 7–3 lead. Minnesota responded with a drive into field goal range, but Mike Bass intercepted a pass from Tarkenton to maintain Washington's lead going into halftime.

The Vikings then took the opening kickoff of the second half and marched 79 yards, including a 46-yard run by Reed, to score on fullback Bill Brown's 2-yard rushing touchdown. To make matters worse for Washington, star cornerback Pat Fischer suffered cracked ribs on the drive and was replaced by Speedy Duncan, an 11-year veteran who normally only played as a kick returner. Still, the Redskins managed to take back the lead with Knight's two third-quarter field goals, first tying a playoff record from 52 yards, and the second from 46 yards on the first play of the fourth quarter.

Now facing a 13–10 fourth-quarter deficit, the Vikings stormed back with two quick touchdowns. First they drove 71 yards in 8 plays to score on Tarkenton's pass to John Gilliam, who beat single coverage by Duncan for a 28-yard touchdown catch. Then on the first play of Washington's ensuing drive, Nate Wright intercepted a pass from Kilmer and returned it 26 yards to the Redskins 8-yard line, setting up a 6-yard touchdown pass from Tarkenton to Gilliam that made the score 24–13. With 5:28 left, Washington got back to within four points, getting good field position due to Ken Stone blocking a Vikings punt and converting it into Kilmer's 28-yard touchdown pass to Roy Jefferson. But the Vikings managed to burn up 4 minutes with their ensuing drive, finishing it off with a 30-yard Cox field goal that gave them a 27–20 lead. The Redskins had less than two minutes to drive for a tying touchdown, and ended up turning the ball over on downs at the Vikings 42-yard line.

Tarkenton completed 16/28 passes for 222 yards and two touchdowns, with one interception. Reed had 17 carries for 95 yards and caught four passes for 76. Brown rushed for 115 yards and a touchdown, while also catching two passes for 13 yards.

"Sometimes they’re not concentrating on me," said Oscar Reed, in reference to his big plays in the game. "Since early in the season they've been keying on Chuck Foreman. I'm not the world's greatest pass catcher or runner, but given a little room, I'll use what I've got."

NFC Championship Game: at Dallas Cowboys

The Vikings forced four interceptions and recovered two fumbles in the second half while also holding Dallas to 152 total yards en route to a 27–10 victory over the Cowboys.

With the loss of running back Calvin Hill and defensive tackle Bob Lilly to injuries, Dallas' offense could not get anything going. Minnesota jumped to a 10–0 lead by halftime with a Fred Cox field goal and an 86-yard drive that ended with a 5-yard rushing touchdown by Chuck Foreman. The touchdown drive included Fran Tarkenton's completions to tight end Stu Voigt for gains of 16 and 7 yards, a 2-yard run by Foreman on 4th-and-1, and a 12-yard scramble by Tarkenton himself.

What followed would be an amazingly sloppy second half in which both teams combined for 10 turnovers. Three minutes into the third quarter, Dallas quarterback Roger Staubach threw an interception to Bobby Bryant on the Vikings 2-yard line. But the Cowboys defense forced a punt and Golden Richards returned it 63 yards for a touchdown, cutting the score to 10–7. Tarkenton quickly struck back, throwing a 54-yard touchdown pass to John Gilliam, who managed to outrun single coverage by Cowboys future Hall of Fame defensive back Mel Renfro. Dallas responded with Toni Fritsch's 17-yard field goal which cut the lead to 17–10.

Then a wave of turnovers began. On the ensuing possession, Dallas got a huge opportunity to score when Charlie Waters forced a fumble from Foreman that safety Cliff Harris recovered on the Minnesota 37. However, the Vikings took the ball right back when Staubach threw a pass that was deflected into the arms of linebacker Jeff Siemon. An even better scoring chance awaited the Cowboys at the end of the Vikings' next drive, as Tarkenton threw an interception to Waters on the Minnesota 24. But Dallas fared no better this time, losing the ball again when Jim Marshall knocked it out of Staubach's hand as he wound up for a pass, and defensive lineman Gary Larsen recovered it. The offensive futility continued with Minnesota, as their next drive ended with a fumbled handoff exchange between Tarkenton and Foreman that Dallas lineman Larry Cole recovered on the Vikings 47-yard line.

A few plays later, Dallas faced 3rd-and-3 with 9 minutes left in the fourth quarter. Staubach attempted a pass to Bob Hayes near the right sideline, but Bryant intercepted the pass and raced 63 yards for a touchdown that put the Vikings up 24–10. Then on Dallas' next drive, Staubach tried to connect with Drew Pearson, but a devastating hit by Nate Wright caused the ball to bounce off his hands and into the arms of defensive back Jeff Wright, who returned the ball 13 yards to set up Cox's 34-yard game clinching field goal.

Both teams combined for a net total of just 163 passing yards. Tarkenton completed only 10/21 passes for 133 yards and a touchdown with one interception, while also rushing for 16 yards. Staubach had one of the worst postseason performances of his career, completing just 10/21 passes for 89 yards and throwing four interceptions, though he did rush for 30 yards. Foreman was the top offensive performer of the day with 76 rushing yards and four receptions for 28, while fullback Oscar Reed added 18 carries for 75 yards and an 8-yard catch.

Super Bowl VIII: vs. Miami Dolphins

Statistics

Team leaders

League rankings

References

External links
Team roster

Minnesota Vikings seasons
National Football Conference championship seasons
Minnesota
NFC Central championship seasons
Minnesota Vikings